Antonio Dura was a Roman Catholic prelate who served as Bishop of Lacedonia (1506–1538).

Biography
On 29 July 1506, Antonio Dura was appointed during the papacy of Pope Julius II as Bishop of Lacedonia.
He served as Bishop of Lacedonia until his resignation in 1538.

References

External links and additional sources
 (for Chronology of Bishops) 
 (for Chronology of Bishops) 

16th-century Italian Roman Catholic bishops
Bishops appointed by Pope Julius II